The Makati Park and Garden, sometimes called Fort Bonifacio Riverside Park and Liwasang Bonifacio by local residents, is an urban riverfront park along the south bank of the Pasig River in Makati, Metro Manila, Philippines. The park is under the management of the Parks and Green Division of Makati's Department of Environmental Services. It was created in 2001 as part of the Linear Parks Project of the Pasig River Rehabilitation Commission.

Description

The Makati Park and Garden is located in barangays West Rembo and Cembo, just east of Guadalupe Nuevo and north of Bonifacio Global City. It is bordered by J.P. Rizal Avenue to the south, the Makati Aqua Sports Arena to the east, and the Rizal Riverwalk and Lawton Avenue to the west. The University of Makati main campus, Fort Bonifacio Elementary and High School, the Ermita de San Nicolas de Tolentino and Makati City Jail are located just across the street from the park. The park is one of 25 Pasig riverside parks in Metro Manila developed by Financial Building Corporation in 2001 under contract from the Pasig River Rehabilitation Commission. It is also a bird sanctuary and one of five plant nurseries in Makati.

A prominent feature of the park is the monument to Andrés Bonifacio located on the western side near the parking area. The monument, designed by Filipino sculptor Juan Sajid Imao, son of National Artist Abdulmari Imao, was erected in 1997 to commemorate Bonifacio's death centennial. The park also features a small lake, fountains, a man-made waterfall, an aviary, amphiteater, pavilion, and gazebos, including a floating octagonal gazebo. The park's Artist Pavilion serves as a function hall and is a favorite venue for social activities and receptions such as wedding and birthdays. The Makati Aqua Sports Arena is a popular recreational facility located on the park's eastern side. The arena is open from Tuesdays to Sundays and charges an entrance fee. The Makati Park also charges fees for use of the Artist Pavilion.

In November 2017, the Bonifacio monument at the park was dismantled by the Department of Public Works and Highways to make way for the construction of Santa Monica–Lawton Bridge, which would link Bonifacio Global City with Ortigas Center.

In 2022, the Supreme Court of the Philippines ruled that Makati should stop exercising jurisdiction over West Rembo and Cembo, where the Makati Park and Garden is located, effectively placing the park in Taguig.

References

Parks in Makati
Buildings and structures in Makati
Pasig River
Redeveloped ports and waterfronts in the Philippines